Rafael Quesada (born 16 August 1971) is an American-born Peruvian footballer. He played in three matches for the Peru national football team from 1993 to 1996. He was also part of Peru's squad for the 1995 Copa América tournament.

References

External links
 

1971 births
Living people
Peruvian footballers
Peru international footballers
Association football goalkeepers
Soccer players from Miami